The final of the Women's 200 metres Individual Medley event at the 1997 European Aquatics Championships was held in Saturday 23 August 1997 in Seville, Spain.

Finals

Qualifying heats

See also
1996 Women's Olympic Games 200m Individual Medley
1997 Women's World Championships (SC) 200m Individual Medley

References
 scmsom results
 La Gazzetta Archivio
 swimrankings

M